Coelogyne parishii is a species of orchid. It was named by Joseph Dalton Hooker in honour of the botanist and plant collector Charles Parish, in 1862.

References 

parishii|parishii|parishii
Orchids of Myanmar
Endemic flora of Myanmar
Taxa named by Joseph Dalton Hooker